The Church of the Multiplication of the Loaves and Fish, shortened to the Church of the Multiplication, is a Roman Catholic church located at Tabgha, on the northwest shore of the Sea of Galilee in Israel. The modern church rests on the site of two earlier churches.

Religious affiliation
The church is maintained and overseen by the Benedictine Order.

History

First Byzantine church (4th century)
The first church, built alongside the important road that passes by, was erected around 350 AD by Joseph of Tiberias. It was first mentioned by Egeria in 380.

Second Byzantine church (5th century)
The church was significantly enlarged around the year 480, with floor mosaics also added at this time. These renovations are attributed to the Patriarch Martyrius of Jerusalem. In AD 614 Persians destroyed the Byzantine church.

19th-20th-century rediscovery
After the AD 614 destruction, the exact site of the shrine was lost for some 1,300 years. In 1888 the site was acquired by the German Catholic Society for Palestine (Palästina-Verein der Katholiken Deutschlands) which was associated with the Archdiocese of Cologne. An initial archaeological survey was conducted in 1892, with full excavations beginning in 1932. These excavations resulted in the discovery of mosaic floors from the 5th-century church, which was also found to be built on the foundations of a much smaller 4th-century chapel.

20th-century reconstruction
Since 1939 the property has been administered by the Benedictine order as a daughter-house of the Dormition Abbey in Jerusalem. The ground was bought in 1888 by the German Catholic Palestine Mission, archeological research started in 1892. In the 1930s a provisional protective structure was erected above the holy rock and the Byzantine mosaics. The current church, inaugurated in 1984, was built to the same floor plan as the 5th-century Byzantine church, some of the ancient black basalt walls have survived and remain visible. The Cologne-based architects Anton Goergen and Fritz designed a simple, modest building in a somewhat neo-Byzantine style. The windows are fitted with alabaster panels. The bright limestone stones were brought from a quarry near Taybeh (between Jericho and Ramallah), the red bricks from Italy and the roof timbering from Germany. The portal is a work by the German sculptor Elmar Hillebrand.

Arson attack

On 17 June 2015, an auxiliary building next to the church was significantly damaged by an arson attack committed by Jewish extremists. Hebrew graffiti, with the words "false idols will be smashed", taken from the Jewish prayer Aleinu, was sprayed on the walls of the adjacent dormitory. This incident followed a series of arson and graffiti attacks by Jewish extremists against Christian sites.
 Israeli officials have labeled the attack as "terrorism". "Whatever repairs are not covered by insurance must be paid for by the Israeli government", said Wadie Abunassar, media spokesman for the Assembly of Catholic Ordinaries of the Holy Land. "We believe this attack was tantamount to a terror attack, and when there is a terror attack the state is responsible for paying for compensation and prosecutes the perpetrators."

In late July 2015, four Israeli Jews age 18 to 24 and an unnamed minor were arrested by the Israel police and indicted for the arson. The suspects are reportedly associated with the Jewish extremist, ultra-nationalist Hilltop Youth.

The media coverage at the time of the arson largely distorted the fact that the church building itself had been unharmed. In February 2017, new media reports suggested that the church itself had been closed for nearly two years as a result for the arson attack, although it was open throughout the time.

Interior

Layout
The interior of the church has a central nave and two aisles. The sanctuary is backed by an apse with transepts on either side. Under the altar is a block of limestone found during excavation, that is venerated as the stone on which the miraculous meal was laid.

Mosaics
One of the main highlights of the church are its restored 5th-century mosaics. These are the earliest known examples of figurative floor mosaics in Christian art in the Holy Land. The mosaics in the two transepts depict various wetland birds and plants, with a prominent place given to the lotus flower. This flower, which is not indigenous to the area, suggests the artist's use of a Nilotic landscape popular in Roman and Early Byzantine art. All the other motifs depict plants and animals from the Galilee. The mosaic found in front of the altar depicts two fish flanking a basket containing four loaves of bread.

Fourth- and fifth-century remains
Also preserved in the modern church are the sill of the left entrance to the atrium, basalt paving stones, and part of the apse frieze. The foundations of the original 4th-century church can also be seen under a glass panel to the right of the altar.

Outside the atrium
A basalt-made oil press is displayed in the courtyard, as is a baptismal font outside of it.

Gallery

References

External links

Church of the Multiplication Israel Ministry of Foreign Affairs
Church of the Loaves and Fish, Tabgha
Photos of the Church of the Multiplication at the Manar al-Athar photo archive

Roman Catholic churches in Israel
Buildings and structures in Northern District (Israel)
Tourist attractions in Northern District (Israel)
Byzantine church buildings in Israel
Roman Catholic churches completed in 1982
1982 establishments in Israel
Israeli mosaics
20th-century Roman Catholic church buildings in Israel
Sea of Galilee